Tudo Bem! is an album by American jazz guitarist Joe Pass and percussionist Paulinho da Costa that was released in 1978.

"I Live to Love" is a duet with Brazilian guitarist Oscar Castro-Neves.

Reception

Writing for Allmusic, music critic Scott Yanow wrote of the album "Pass plays warm solos on a variety of Brazilian tunes. Highlights include three songs by Antônio Carlos Jobim (including "Corcovado" and "Wave"), Deodato's "Tears," and Luiz Bonfa's "The Gentle Rain." A melodic and infectious date..."

Track listing
"Corcovado" (Antônio Carlos Jobim, Vinicius de Moraes) – 6:20
"Tears (Razao de Viver)" (Eumir Deodato, Paulo Sérgio Valle) – 3:32
"Wave" (Jobim) – 10:08
"Voce (You)" (Ronaldo Bôscoli, Roberto Menescal) – 3:10
"If You Went Away" (Marcos Valle) – 3:04
"Que Que Ha?" (Octavio Bailly, Jr., Don Grusin) – 6:50
"The Gentle Rain (Chuva Delicada)" (Luiz Bonfá, Matt Dubey) – 4:11
"Barquinho" (Bôscoli, Menescal) – 6:11
"Luciana" (de Moraes, Jobim, Gene Lees) – 4:55
"I Live to Love" (Oscar Castro-Neves, Luverci Fiorini, Ray Gilbert) – 3:20

Personnel
 Joe Pass - guitar
 Paulinho da Costa – percussion
Octavio Bailly, Jr. - bass
Oscar Castro-Neves - guitar on "I Live to Love"
Don Grusin - keyboards
Claudio Slon - drums
Production notes
Norman Granz - producer
Val Valentin - engineer

References

External links
Joe Pass Memorial Hall

1978 albums
Collaborative albums
Joe Pass albums
Albums produced by Norman Granz
Pablo Records albums
Paulinho da Costa albums